Robert Hackman (1 January 1941 – 23 March 2018) was a former Ghanaian male athlete. He represented Ghana in the 3000 metres steeplechase at the 1972 Summer Olympics.

References 

1941 births
2018 deaths
Athletes (track and field) at the 1970 British Commonwealth Games
Athletes (track and field) at the 1972 Summer Olympics
Olympic athletes of Ghana
Ghanaian male athletes
Commonwealth Games competitors for Ghana